The Audi Nuvolari quattro (also known as the Audi Lisvina) was a concept car created by German automaker Audi. The vehicle was introduced at the 2003 Geneva Motor Show, the second of three Audi concept cars shown in 2003, after the Pikes Peak quattro and ahead of the Le Mans quattro.

The car used Audi's Torsen-based quattro permanent four-wheel drive system.

The Nuvolari quattro was named after Tazio Nuvolari.

Audi subsequently developed the car quattro into the A5 range.

References

External links

 Audi corporate website
 Audi Official 2003 Product Strategy
 Vision of the GT of the Future: Audi Nuvolari quattro

Audi concept vehicles